Per Wind, born Per Wind Andersen (born 15 August 1955), is a Danish former professional footballer who played 590 games as a goalkeeper for Boldklubben Frem.

Playing career
Wind made his debut for Boldklubben Frem in 1973, and spent his entire 20-year-long senior career with the club, before retiring in 1993.

Later career
Wind and Finn Bøje became managers of Frem in 1993, and he went on to coach a number of amateur teams. He was hired as Frem's goalkeeping coach in 1997, and he made a one-match come-back for the club in 1998. He also worked for Carlsberg Group for 23 years.

In 1999, he was employed as goalkeeping coach at F.C. Copenhagen on a full-time basis.

Personal life
Per Wind is the father of F.C. Copenhagen and Wolfsburg striker Jonas Wind.

Honours
Danish Cup: 1978 with Frem

External links
 
  F.C. København profile

1955 births
Living people
Danish men's footballers
Denmark international footballers
Boldklubben Frem players
Association football goalkeepers
Danish football managers
Boldklubben Frem managers
F.C. Copenhagen non-playing staff
Footballers from Copenhagen